Khalil Ahmad (born December 24, 1996) is an American basketball player for Hapoel Be.er Sheva in the Israeli Basketball Premier League. He plays the shooting guard position. He played college basketball for Cal State Fullerton.

Early life and high school
Ahmad was born in Anaheim, California, to Tariq and Michelle Ahmad, has a younger sister, Aliyah, and his hometown is Corona, California, southeast of Los Angeles. He is 6' 4" (193 cm) tall, and weighs 185 pounds (84 kg).

He played high school basketball at both guard positions for Centennial High School ('15) in Corona. As a senior Ahmad averaged 11.8 points, 7.2 rebounds, and 2.3 assists per game.

College career
Ahmad played college basketball for the Titans for Cal State Fullerton ('19) from 2015–19. In 2016 he averaged 14.3 points per game (7th in the Big West Conference) as the league's top scoring freshman, and was 8th in the conference with a .772 free throw percentage, along with 4.4 rebounds and 1.6 assists per game, and was named Big West Freshman of the Year and All-Big West Honorable Mention. 

As a junior in 2017–18 he scored 15.1 points per game (6th in the Big West), with 1.2 steals per game (8th) and an .829 free throw percentage (5th). In 2018–19 he scored 18.2 points per game (4th in the Big West), and led he league in steals with 1.6 per game, while shooting an .814 free throw percentage (6th). In both 2018 and 2019 he was named All-Big West Second Team and Big West All-Tournament Team. In 2019 he then played in the invite-only Drew Summer League in Los Angeles.

Professional career
In 2019–20 Ahmad played for Keflavik in the Úrvalsdeild karla in Iceland.  He averaged 19.1 points, 4.6 rebounds, 3.0 assists, and 2.1 steals per game.

In 2021–22 he first played for Horsens IC of Basketligaen in Denmark, averaging 19.2 points per game (4th in the league), 4.5 assists per game (10th), and 1.8 steals per game (6th). Ahmad was named to the Eurobasket.com All-Danish Ligaen Second Team.

That season Ahmad next played for the Niagara River Lions of the CEBL, with whom he averaged a league-high 20.7 points per game, with 4.6 assists per game (7th-most in the league) and 1.9 steals (4th-best). In 2021–22 he was named both Canadian Elite Basketball League Player of the Year and Canadian Elite Basketball League Clutch Player of the Year. In September 2022, at the invitation of the NBA's Utah Jazz, he attended a mini-camp that they held.

In 2022–23 Ahmad is playing for Hapoel Be.er Sheva in the Israeli Basketball Premier League.

References 

1996 births
Living people
American expatriate basketball people in Canada
American expatriate basketball people in Denmark
American expatriate basketball people in Iceland
American expatriate basketball people in Israel
American men's basketball players
Basketball players from Anaheim, California
Cal State Fullerton Titans men's basketball players
Guards (basketball)
Hapoel Be'er Sheva B.C. players
Horsens IC players
Israeli Basketball Premier League players
Keflavík men's basketball players
Niagara River Lions players
Sportspeople from Corona, California